François-Alexandre-Henri Conneau (1803–1877) or Doctor Conneau (Docteur), was a loyal attendant of Napoleon III.

Further reading
 Docteur Henri Conneau (Milan,1803-La Porta,1877) Ami le Plus Fidèle, Confident le Plus Intime de l'Empereur Napoléon III Bernard, Hervé., Biarritz 2008 (French).

References

1803 births
1877 deaths